Andriy Yevheniyovych Biletsky (born 5 August 1979) is a Ukrainian far-right politician. He is the leader of political party National Corps. He was the first commander of the volunteer militia Azov Battalion, which he founded in 2014, and a co-founder of the nationalist movement Social-National Assembly. From 2014 until 2019 Biletsky was a People's Deputy of Ukraine.

Biography
Andriy Biletsky was born in 1979 in Kharkiv, Soviet Union. Biletsky's father Yevheniy Mykhailovych Biletsky hailed from an old Cossack family that founded the village of Krasnopavlivka (Lozova Raion), while Biletsky's mother Olena Anatoliyivna Biletsky (née Lukashevych) descended from a noble family from Zhytomyr region, to which belong the Decembrist Vasiliy Lukashevich (Vasyl Lukashevych) who founded the "Little-Russian Secret Society".

In his youth, Biletsky practiced several types of martial arts and boxing. Unlike many Ukrainians, he declined to join the Vladimir Lenin All-Union Pioneer Organization. Biletsky, along with senior schoolmates, raised the Ukrainian flag over his school. His major patriotic influence in his youth was his father's gift of a book prohibited in the Soviet Union, History of Ukraine for Children by Anton Lototsky. During the Kosovo War, Biletsky and a group of other Ukrainians attempted to join the Yugoslav Army as volunteers to fight against the Kosovo Liberation Army (KLA), but the war ended before they arrived at the front. In 2001, Biletsky graduated with honors from the History faculty of the University of Kharkiv. His thesis was about the Ukrainian Insurgent Army. The same year Biletsky participated in the Ukraine without Kuchma (UBK) protests, for which he was placed under administrative arrest. The Security Service of Ukraine pressured the university administration to expel Biletsky from the institution.

Political activism (2002–2013)
In 2002 Biletsky became a leader of the Kharkiv branch of the political organization Tryzub, and was a member of the Kharkiv section of the Social-National Party of Ukraine (SNPU), but opposed the idea of its transformation into Svoboda.

After the transformation of SNPU into Svoboda and liquidation of the original Patriot of Ukraine, in 2005 Biletsky initiated a revival of the Patriot of Ukraine, independent from any political factions. The new Patriot of Ukraine initially consisted of the Kharkiv branches of UNA-UNSO, Tryzub, and former SNPU. Since 2005, Biletsky also cooperated with the newly established Ukrainian Conservative Party.

In the 2006 Ukrainian parliamentary election, Biletsky unsuccessfully ran for Ukrainian parliament.

Patriot of Ukraine, Azov Battalion (2014)

During the Euromaidan events, members of the Biletsky's Patriot of Ukraine were among the founders of Right Sector on 28 November 2013. On 24 February 2014, the Ukrainian parliament adopted a decision on the freedom of political prisoners. The next day, Biletsky and other prisoners were completely acquitted of all charges and freed from custody.

On 12 March 2014, Biletsky became a party leader in special operations for the "Right Sector - East," which included such regions as Poltava, Kharkiv, Donetsk, and Luhansk oblasts. On 5 May 2014, in Berdyansk Biletsky became a founder of the Azov Battalion (as a territorial battalion of patrol service), and its first commander. The battalion was initially composed of members of the Patriot of Ukraine, SNA, football fans (notably Dynamo Kyiv supporters) and the AutoMaidan movement. The paramilitary unit became known as the Little black men as an opposition to the Russian special operations "Little green men". It would be transformed from a militia into a regular regiment of the National Guard of Ukraine on 20 November 2014.

On 13 June 2014, Biletsky led his detachment in the successful First Battle of Mariupol. According to British military reporter Askold Krushelnycky, "Biletsky was cool in the evaluation of actions and giving orders calmly and, in my opinion, logically". On 2 August 2014, Biletsky, holding a rank of Major of Militsiya, was awarded the Order For Courage (III degree) and promoted to lieutenant colonel of police on 15 August 2014.

On 10 September 2014, Biletsky was admitted to the military council of the People's Front, yet did not become a member of the party. On 27 September 2014, he ran as an independent candidate in the 217th electoral district (Kyiv) for the 2014 Ukrainian parliamentary election and won by receiving 31,445 votes (33.75%). In parliament, he joined the inter-factional group UKROP. In October 2014, Ihor Mykhailenko replaced Biletsky as commander of Azov Battalion.

In an interview to LB.ua (Left Bank) given on 10 December 2014, Biletsky announced that the Patriot of Ukraine suspended its activities as a political organization due to the war, and would be absorbed primarily into the Azov Battalion. In the same interview Biletsky said that the logo of the battalion is different from the German Wolfsangel and symbolizes Ukrainian national idea.

Elected official (2016–2019)
On October 14, 2016, Biletsky was voted as the leader of the newly formed party National Corps.
In October 2016 Biletsky officially left the Ukrainian National Guard because Ukrainian elected officials were barred from military service, but he vowed to continue his military career "without titles".

During his first three years of work in Verkhovna Rada Biletsky participated only in 2% of votes, He took part in only 229 votings, taking the fifth place in the rating of deputies with the fewest votings. He missed 328 sittings of the Ukrainian parliament. He missed all sittings of the Verkhovna Rada in 2016 and did not appear in parliament as of March 2017. According to a research of the Committee of Voters of Ukraine, published in August 2017, Biletsky did not write any laws that were adopted in the Verkhovna Rada. With 30 unsuccessful projects, he is in the first place among the deputies who submitted unsuccessful draft laws.

In the 2019 Ukrainian parliamentary election he was placed 2nd on the joined list of Svoboda with the far-right National Corps, the Governmental Initiative of Yarosh and Right Sector. His party did not win enough votes to clear the 5% election threshold and thus did not gain any parliamentary seats.

2020–present

Political views
In 2010, Biletsky said that the Ukrainian nation's mission is to "lead the white races of the world in a final crusade...against Semite-led Untermenschen". Biletsky denied ever making such remarks and said that it was a fake quotation fabricated by Sergey Lavrov to defame him. 

Until 2011 Biletsky was in favour of forming a confederation between Russia and Ukraine, with Kyiv as its capital, according to BBC News Ukrainian.

The Independent reported in 2022 that Biletsky is also known as White Leader. In 2013 he wrote a brochure called The Word of the White Leader. According to a 2021 paper by political scientists Umland and Fedorenko, he had been known as white leader before 2014, but has subsequently claimed that "if someone called me white leader face-to-face, [that person] would have been beaten".

, the BBC, The Independent and The Moscow Times have described Biletsky as a white supremacist. As of 2014 he had been accused of neo-Nazi views by sociologist Volodymyr Ishchenko.

In 2018, The Guardian reported that Biletsky "has toned down his rhetoric in recent years". Freedom House initiative Reporting Radicalism reported  that he has not publicly made racist remarks since 2014, but he does "invoke anti-LGBT+ rhetoric frequently". Umland and Fedorenko wrote in 2021 that he still publicly objects to multiculturalism, but has stated "to be a Ukrainian nationalist today is to believe in values, not racial prejudice", and announced that his party does not use ethnicity to define who can, or cannot, be part of the nation Ukraine.

Earnings
According to the electronic declaration, in 2015, Biletsky received ₴ 58,990 (US$2,087) as salary in the Verkhovna Rada. He had ₴ 250,000 (US$8,846) in cash. The declaration also indicated an apartment in Kyiv (see below), which was recorded as belonging to Biletsky's spouse Yuliya. In the declaration for 2016, Biletsky indicated 115,652 hryvnia (US$4,423) as deputy salary, and ₴ 250,000 in cash.

Personal life
From 2003 to 2016, Andriy Biletsky was married to Yuliya Oleksandrivna Biletska (née Brusenko); their son was born in 2007. In April 2016, the couple divorced.

References

External links
 Biletsky, A. Word of the White Leader. "RiD". Kharkiv.
 Profile at the Ukrainian parliament website

1979 births
Living people
Politicians from Kharkiv
National University of Kharkiv alumni
Ukrainian nationalists
People of Ukraine without Kuchma
People of the National Guard of Ukraine
Ukrainian police officers
Ukrainian fascists
Far-right politics in Ukraine
Prisoners and detainees of Ukraine
Ukrainian prisoners and detainees
Eighth convocation members of the Verkhovna Rada
Independent politicians in Ukraine
Recipients of the Order For Courage, 3rd class
Ukrainian military personnel of the war in Donbas